Chuck Berry is the eighteenth studio album by Chuck Berry, released in 1975 by Chess Records. Some pressings of this album carry the title Chuck Berry '75. Berry's daughter, Ingrid, contributed backing vocals.

This was Berry's final new album release for Chess Records, ending his off-and-on association with the label dating back 21 years. He moved to Atco Records, for which he recorded his next studio album, Rockit, in 1979.

Track listing

 "Swanee River“ (Stephen Foster; adapted and arranged by Chuck Berry) – 2:38
 "I'm Just a Name“ (Berry) – 3:37
 "I Just Want to Make Love to You“ (Willie Dixon) – 3:05
 "Too Late“ (Berry) – 2:45
 "South of the Border“ (Jimmy Kennedy, Michael Carr) – 2:22
 "Hi Heel Sneakers“ (Robert Higgenbotham) – 4:40
 "You Are My Sunshine“ (Charles Mitchell, Jimmie Davis) – 2:50
 "My Babe“ (Walter Jacobs) – 2:28
 "Baby What You Want Me to Do“ (Jimmy Reed) – 2:34
 "A Deuce“ (Berry) – 2:31
 "Shake, Rattle and Roll“ (Charles E. Calhoun) – 2:15
 "Sue Answer“ (Berry) – 2:25
 "Don't You Lie to Me“ (Berry) – 3:45

Personnel

Musicians
 Chuck Berry – guitar, piano, vocals
 Billy Peek – guitar (tracks 10, 12)
 Elliot Randall – guitar (except tracks 9, 10, 12)
 Wilbur Bascomb – bass
 Greg Edick – bass (tracks 10, 12)
 Ernie Hayes – piano 
 Jimmy Johnson, Jr. – drums
 Ron Reed – drums (tracks 10, 12)
 Earl Williams – drums (tracks 2, 4)
 Ingrid Berry Gibson – vocals (tracks 2, 4, 9)

Technical
 Esmond Edwards – producer
 Bob Scerbo – production supervision
 Neil Terk – art direction

References

External links

Chuck Berry albums
1975 albums
Albums produced by Esmond Edwards
Chess Records albums